Haribhau is a given name. Notable people with the name include:

Haribhau Bagade (born 1944), Indian politician
Haribhau Jawale (1953–2000), Indian politician
Haribhau Joshi (died 2009), Indian politician
Haribhau Upadhyaya, Indian politician
Sanjay Haribhau Jadhav, Indian politician